Lintun Commandery was a commandery established in the Korean peninsula by the Chinese Han dynasty. Lintun Commandery was one of the Four Commanderies of Han along with Lelang Commandery, Xuantu Commandery and Zhenfan Commandery.

History
In BC 108, Lintun Commandery was established as part of Youzhou by Han dynasty. This commandery was formed by 15 prefectures and its border is almost the same as the current Gangwon Province. Dongyi (Hanja:東暆) prefecture (present-day Gangneung City), the main office for this commandery was about 2400 km away from Chang'an. In 82 BC, 9 prefectures out of 15 had been abolished and 7 prefectures including Fuzu/Bujo (Hanja:夫租) prefecture were incorporated to Lelang Commandery. At this point, Lintun Commandery was disappeared from history.

Administrative area

Revisionism
In the North Korean academic community and some part of the South Korean academic community, the Han dynasty's annexation of the Korean peninsula have been denied. Proponents of this revisionist theory claim that the Four Commandaries of Han actually existed outside of the Korean peninsula, and place them somewhere in Liaodong Commandery, China instead. According to this theory, the Lintun Commandery was said to be located in the southern part of Liaodong peninsula, especially in Jinzhou peninsula. 

These hypotheses are "dictatorial" in the academic community of North Korea, which is supported by the amateur historical enthusiasts in South Korea, but this theory is not recognized at all in the academic circles of the United States, China and Japan.

See also
Four Commanderies of Han
Lelang Commandery
Xuantu Commandery
Zhenfan Commandery
Daifang commandery
Canghai Commandery

Notes

References

100s BC establishments
Four Commanderies of Han